Nazanin Ahmadi is an Iranian actress. She has received various accolades, including a Crystal Simorgh, in addition to nomination for an Iran's Film Critics and Writers Association Award.

Filmography

Film

Television

Theater

Awards and nominations

References

External links 

 

Living people
People from Tehran
Iranian film actresses
Iranian stage actresses
University of Tehran alumni
Iranian television actresses
21st-century Iranian actresses
Year of birth missing (living people)
Crystal Simorgh for Best Actress winners